COMPASS, also referred to as Freeway Traffic Management System, is a system run by the Ministry of Transportation of Ontario (MTO) to monitor and manage the flow of traffic on various roads (including 400-series highways) in Ontario.

COMPASS uses pairs of in-road sensors to detect the speed and density of traffic flow. This data is fed to a central computer at the MTO Downsview office and analyzed by operators, who also view the feeds of traffic cameras placed along the highways. Changeable Message Signs (CMS) then display messages to motorists on the highways, advising them of upcoming collisions, closures, detours and traffic flow.

Algorithms
The primary algorithm used by the Ministry is known as the McMaster algorithm, designed by Professor Fred Hall of McMaster University, in Hamilton, Ontario. Incident Detection algorithms have also been widely used throughout the COMPASS-enabled area.

Research on new algorithm developments and evaluations is performed at the ITS Centre and Testbed (ICAT), at the Civil Engineering department of the University of Toronto.  The ICAT is equipped with direct fibre-optic links to the Ministry of Transportation, and received both traffic camera and loop detector data on a live basis.  Visual data can be used to confirm the presence of incidents detected by the various algorithms.

COMPASS cameras
Images from most COMPASS cameras are available online via MTO website.

COMPASS has some dedicated cameras used by MTO Enforcement Officers to monitor and manage truck queues at locations such as the Putman Commercial Vehicle Inspection Station. Images from these cameras are not available online.

Highways with COMPASS cameras:

Queen Elizabeth Way (QEW)
(Fort Erie, Niagara Falls to St Catharines, Stoney Creek to Toronto)
 QEW from Thompson Rd to Bowen Rd (Fort Erie)
 QEW from Mountain Road to 7th Street (Niagara Falls to St. Catharines)
 QEW from Fifty Rd to Highway 427 (Stoney Creek to Toronto )

Highway 400
 Highway 400 from Highway 401 to King Rd (Toronto-King City)

Highway 401
(London and Windsor, Milton to Ajax, Kingston, Ivy Lea). One of the highest-volume highways in the world
 Highway 401 from Martin Street to Simcoe St (Milton-Oshawa)
 Highway 401 from near Wellington Road South to near Old Victoria Road South in (London, Ontario)

Highway 402
(Vyner to Sarnia)
 Highway 402 from Mandaumin Road to Front Street North (Sarnia)

Highway 403
(Hamilton to Burlington, Oakville to Mississauga)
 Highway 403 from Aberdeen to QEW (Hamilton-Burlington)
 Highway 403 from QEW  to Highway 401 (Oakville-Mississauga)

Highway 404
(Toronto to Markham)
 Highway 404 from Highway 401/Don Valley Parkway to 16th Ave (Toronto-Markham)

Highway 405
(Niagara Falls)
 Highway 405 from QEW to Queenston-Lewiston Bridge (St. Catharines-Niagara On The Lake)

Highway 406
 Highway 406 South of QEW (St. Catharines)

Highway 407
 Highway 407 from Brock Rd to Highway 418 (Pickering to Clarington)

Highway 409
(Toronto)
 Highway 409 from Highway 427 to Highway 401 (Toronto)

Highway 410
(Mississauga to Brampton)
 Highway 410 from Highway 401 to Clark Blvd (Peel Region)

Highway 412
 Highway 412 from Brock Rd to Highway 412 (Durham Region)

Highway 417
(the Queensway, Ottawa)
 Highway 417 from Ottawa Road 174 to 416/Richmond Road (Ottawa Region)

Highway 427
(Toronto)
 Highway 427 from Gardiner Expressway/QEW to Finch(Toronto-York Region)

Non 400-series Highways
 Highway 58 from Pine Street to Thorold Stone Road (including Thorold Tunnel) (Thorold)
 Thorold Stone Road
 Wolfe Island Ferry Terminals - Kingston and Wolfe Island (2)
 1000 Islands Parkway - Ivy Lea
 E.C. Row Expressway - COMPASS uses images from City of Windsor.
 City of Windsor - Images from both City of Windsor and COMPASS are available on MTO website via COMPASS interface.

False alarms

A false alarm for incident detection is not only highly undesirable, but seriously damages the confidence in the detection system. Therefore, a near 100% alarm accuracy is needed. This does not mean that 100% traffic parameter accuracy is required from the traffic sensors; however, the logical commands that analyze the change in traffic parameters need to be selected carefully in order to minimize the probability of false alarms yet detect all major incidents as well as a high percentage of all other incidents. Most importantly, confirmation of incident and evaluation of incident type by manual inspection of a video camera screen is probably the most significant incident detection technique.

See also

 Electronic Monitoring and Advisory System - a similar type of system in Singapore
 Motorway Incident Detection and Automatic Signalling
 Road Emergency Services Communications Unit - system used on the Don Valley Parkway by the City of Toronto
 Hong Kong Intelligent Transport System (ITS) - uses same technology through Delcan International Corporation, designer of the Traffic Control System used by COMPASS

References

Explanation of the logical functioning of COMPASS

Automotive safety
Road infrastructure in Canada
Transport in Ontario
Intelligent transportation systems